Shixingoolithus is an oogenus of dinosaur egg from the Cretaceous of Nanxiong, China.

Description
Shixingoolithus eggs are nearly spherical, and about 12 cm in diameter, with a shell thickness of 2.3-2.6 mm. The shell is made up of tall, prismatic units, and has narrow, irregular pore canals. Its cone layer (mammillae) is approximately a fourth of the shell thickness.

Paleobiology
Shixingoolithus probably represents eggs of an ornithopod dinosaur. 
They are known from the Pingling Formation and Chishan Formation (from the Upper Maastrichtian), but are absent from the Yuanpu Formation, indicating that they disappeared in the last 200,000 to 300,000 years of the Cretaceous.<ref name="Zhaoetal2002">Zhao, Z.-k., X. Mao, Z. Chai, G. Yang, P. Kong, M. Ebihara, and Z.-h. Zhao. (2002). "A possible causal relationship between extinction of dinosaurs and K/T iridium enrichment in the Nanxiong Basin, South China: evidence from dinosaur eggshells. Palaeogeography, Palaeoclimatology, Palaeoecology 178:1-17.</ref>

ParataxonomyShixingoolithus was initially described as a member of the Spheroolithidae on the basis of its spherical shape, and similarities to other spheroolithid eggs. In 2012, Wang et al. classified Shixingoolithus in a new oofamily, Stalicoolithidae, alongside Stalicoolithus and Coralloidoolithus'', because of the secondary eggshell units found in its pore canals. However, these secondary shell units may in fact simply be taphonomic artifacts. It has also been speculated to in fact be a dendroolithid, but a more complete description must be made before its classification can be resolved.

See also

 List of dinosaur oogenera

References

Dinosaur reproduction
Fossil parataxa described in 1991
Stalicoolithids